Bowfishing is a method of hunting fish that uses specialized archery equipment to lethally shoot and retrieve the animal. Fish are shot with a barbed arrow that is attached with a special line to a reel mounted on a bow or crossbow. Historically, bowfishing was practiced for subsistence, but in the 21st Century it has increasingly become sport, mostly practiced in the USA. Sport bowfishing is mostly unregulated as of 2023, but is increasingly gaining attention and study.

Equipment

Bows

Traditionally, bows were usually very simple. Most did not have sights, and aiming was executed by line-of-sight judgment down the arrow. Modern sport bowfishing mostly uses sophisticated compound or lever-action bows, some of which are fitted with laser sights. There are a couple of types of rests including the hook-and-roller rest, and the whisker biscuit. Most bowfishing bows have little to no let-off and are typically designed for 40-50 pounds (18–23 kg) of draw weight. Some other bows can have as much as  draw weight.

The crossbow is also sometimes used in this manner and has its own advantages, including the use of a reel. See Recreational fishing.

Arrows
Bowfishing arrows are considerably heavier and stronger than arrows used in other types of archery and are most commonly constructed of  fiberglass, but solid aluminum, carbon fiber, and carbon fiber reinforced fiberglass are also used. Bowfishing arrows generally lack fletching, as it can cause the arrow to flare to one side or another underwater and they are not required at the relatively short ranges associated with bowfishing. Lighted nocks, and other custom features for arrows associated with night bowfishing are commonly available. Line is attached to the arrow by tying to a hole in the arrow shaft or through the use of a slide system.

Line
Bowfishing line is often made from braided nylon, Dacron, or Spectra. Commonly used line weights range from eighty to four-hundred pound test, with six-hundred being used when bowhunting for alligators. Line color is normally either lime green, white, or neon orange.

Reels
Three types of reels are commonly used in bowfishing: Hand-wrap, spincast, and retriever. Hand-wrap reels are the simplest reels; they consist of a circular spool that line is wrapped onto by hand and then secured in a line holding slot. When the arrow is shot the line comes free from the line holder and feeds off the spool. Fish are caught by pulling the line in hand over hand; hand-wrap reels are the least effective at fighting arrowed fish, but they can be used in conjunction with a float system to shoot and fight large trophy fish.  Retriever reels have a "bottle" which holds the line in place. When shot the line comes out either until the shot goes too far and the line runs out or the hunter pushes down a stopping device which can be used to keep a fish from traveling out too far.  Some retriever reels have slots cut in them and are known as slotted retriever reels.  They are more commonly used for alligator, alligator gar, shark and other big game that will take more time to chase down than smaller game fish.

Boats
Although bowfishing can be done from the shore, bowfishers most often shoot from boats. Flat bottom "john boats" and canoes are used in areas of low water, as they have less draw, but are unsuitable for open water.  Larger boats can accommodate multiple hunters.  Many of these boats are highly customized specifically for bowfishing, with raised shooting platforms, and generators to provide electrical power to multiple lights for bowfishing at night. In dense marshlands that are unfriendly to boat propellers, airboats, which incorporate top-mounted fan propulsion for operating in very shallow waters, are usually used.

Techniques

Along with fishing from boats and off the shore, wading and shooting is also effective as long as the hunter does not mind getting soaked.  Wading in rivers allows the shooter to get up close to the fish if the hunter is skillful. When keeping fish while wading, the hunter may utilize a stringer tied to a belt loop.

Standing on large rocks in shallower parts of a river is another technique. This provides a better view higher out of the water. Going from rock to rock in a river with two hunters gets the fish moving if they are inactive. It is similar to herding the fish to the other hunter; while one hunter is wading the other is stationary on a rock.

All of these river techniques typically work best for carp or catfish, depending on the location.

Aiming
Due to the light refraction at the water surface and the optical distortion of the apparent position of underwater objects (which would appear to be shallower), aiming straight at the target silhouette usually results in a miss.  Aiming well below the target compensates for this optical illusion.  Depth and distance (as well as angle) of the target also impact how far below the fish to aim.

Controversy

During the late 20th Century and into the 21st Century bowfishing has increasingly become an ethically problematic sport prone to wanton waste of historically-underappreciated native species in the United States. Bowfishing's ecological damage has become amplified since the rise of night bowfishing during the 21st Century. No bowfisheries management, complex native fish life histories, lack of funding for historically (and derogatorily) deemed "rough fish", and the heightened vulnerability of freshwater fishes and their habitats worldwide further exacerbates the ecological waste of modern bowfishing.

Modern sport bowfishing (occurring in the US), which is often an effort to amass hundreds of native fish in single outings (sport killing) and to discard them as full-bodied carcasses afterwards, runs exactly counter to central principles of the North American Model of Wildlife Conservation. In addition, a modern biological understanding of several of these targeted native species (e.g., Bigmouth Buffalo, Bowfins, Quillback) has shown that they exhibit complex life cycles that are especially prone to overfishing. Although some invasive species are sport bowfished in the US including some carp species (e.g. common carp), the vast majority of sport bowfished species are ecologically-valuable native species including gars, bowfin, buffalofishes, carpsuckers, redhorse, several other catostomids species, freshwater drum, hiodontids, paddlefish, bullheads, and catfish. These native species have been increasingly pursued in sport for several years, and thus new sportfish management is long overdue. Sport bowfisheries management of native species must be commensurate with the amount of fish removed from the ecosystem, which is significantly greater per bowfishing participant due to the lethality of the sport (catch and release is not possible), and nonexistent limits or extremely liberal limits. In addition, approaching and killing fish aided by powerful spot lights at night is relatively easy because fish are less skittish, wind conditions are calmer, many fishes move shallower, there is no fighting glare from sun and clouds, there is less boat traffic and less law enforcement. Indeed, in the 21st Century night bowfishing has grown in popularity and legality and is most practiced by experienced bowfishers. More than 1,000 native fish can be removed in a single bowfishing outing.In saltwater, rays and sharks are regularly pursued.

Targeted species

Freshwater

Common carp
Bighead carp
Silver carp
Grass carp
River Carpsucker
Longnose gar
Shortnose gar
Spotted Gar
Alligator gar
Paddlefish
Threadfin Shad
Frog
Bigmouth buffalo
Smallmouth buffalo
Freshwater drum
Catfish
American alligator
Tilapia
Bowfin
Asian snakehead

Saltwater

Southern stingray
Cownose ray
Bull shark
Barracuda
Flounder
Sheepshead

Notes

References
 

Archery
Recreational fishing
Fishing techniques and methods
Arrow types

cs:Kaproun obecný